Owen Webster Saylor (August 15, 1887 – March 7, 1971) was an American football and basketball coach.

Coaching career
Saylor was the head football coach at Franklin & Marshall College in Lancaster, Pennsylvania for one season in 1916, compiling a record of 1–7.

Later life
Saylor later served as mayor of Johnstown, Pennsylvania, elected in 1930 to fill the unexpired term of mayor Joseph Cauffield, who was removed from the post for misconduct.

Head coaching record

Football

References

External links
 

1887 births
1971 deaths
American football tackles
Franklin & Marshall Diplomats football coaches
Franklin & Marshall Diplomats football players
Franklin & Marshall Diplomats men's basketball coaches
Mayors of places in Pennsylvania
Politicians from Johnstown, Pennsylvania
Sportspeople from Johnstown, Pennsylvania
Coaches of American football from Pennsylvania
Players of American football from Pennsylvania
Basketball coaches from Pennsylvania